Diana Rosario Ordóñez Torres (born 26 September 2001) is an American-born Mexican professional footballer who plays as a forward for National Women's Soccer League club Houston Dash and the Mexico women's national team.

Early life
Ordóñez was born in Riverside, California, United States, to an Ecuadorian father and an American mother of Mexican descent. She was the youngest of five children. While still a small child, the family moved to Frisco, Texas, a suburb of Dallas. She played soccer for the FC Dallas youth team from 2010 to 2019, winning the Elite Clubs National League U-16 championship in 2017.

Ordóñez initially committed to play college soccer at Texas A&M University, but was urged instead to play at the University of Virginia by a friend, soccer player Taryn Torres. She finished high school a semester early and enrolled at Virginia in January 2019, barely 17 years old. During her Virginia career (2019–2021) she scored 45 goals, tied for third most all time at the University, although she only played three years of her four year eligibility. In 2021 she was a first team All-American and a semifinalist for the MAC Hermann Trophy.

National Women's Soccer League
On 18 December 2021, the North Carolina Courage selected Ordóñez sixth overall in the 2022 National Women's Soccer League Draft. Ordóñez made her first appearance for the Courage in the 2022 NWSL Challenge Cup on 19 March and scored her first goal on 4 May. On 13 August, Ordóñez eighth goal broke the NWSL record for goals scored in a rookie season.

International career
Ordóñez made her senior debut for Mexico women's national team on 9 April 2022.

International goals

References

External links
 
 North Carolina Courage profile
 Virginia profile

2001 births
Living people
Citizens of Mexico through descent
Mexican women's footballers
Women's association football forwards
Mexico women's international footballers
Mexican people of Ecuadorian descent
Sportspeople of Ecuadorian descent
Mexican people of American descent
Soccer players from Riverside, California
American women's soccer players
North Carolina Courage players
United States women's under-20 international soccer players
American people of Ecuadorian descent
American sportspeople of Mexican descent
North Carolina Courage draft picks
Virginia Cavaliers women's soccer players
People from Prosper, Texas
Soccer players from Texas
National Women's Soccer League players